Turbid Creek is a stream in North Slope Borough, Alaska, in the United States. It is a tributary of the Kukpowruk River.

Turbid Creek was so named in 1949 on account of its muddy water.

See also
List of rivers of Alaska

References

Rivers of North Slope Borough, Alaska
Rivers of Alaska